The Heartland Collegiate Conference (HCC) was a football-only intercollegiate athletic conference that evolved out of the Indiana Collegiate Conference (ICC) and competed between 1978 and 1989. Originally comprising the football-playing arm of the ICC, the HCC became its own separate entity after the ICC was dissolved in 1979. The HCC continued for ten more seasons before its own collapse in 1989. When formed in 1978, the conference had members in the states of Indiana, Ohio, and Kentucky.

Members
Membership of the conference when it was formed in 1978.

Champions

1978 – Indiana Central
1979 – Saint Joseph's (IN)
1980 – Ashland and Franklin
1981 – Franklin
1982 – Ashland
1983 – Butler

1984 – Ashland
1985 – Ashland and Butler
1986 – Ashland
1987 – Butler
1988 – Butler
1989 – Butler

Standings

See also
 List of defunct college football conferences

References

 
College sports in Illinois
College sports in Ohio